Wings is an album by the Italian power metal band Skylark. It was released in May 2006 by Scarlet Records.

Track listing 

Rainbow in the Dark - 09:07	
Summer of 2001 - 05:12	
Another Reason to Believe - 05:26	
Belzebú, Part 2 - 09:36	
Faded Fantasy - 03:47	
Last Ride - 09:00	
A Stupid Song - 05:53	
When Love and Hate Collide (Def Leppard cover) - 04:22
Crystal Lake/Skylark (Remaster) - 7:04 (bonus track)
Was Called Empire (Remaster) - 4:57 (bonus track)

Personnel 

Fabio Dozzo - Vocals
Eddy Antonini - Keyboards
Roberto "Brodo" Potenti - Bass
Fabrizio "Pota" Romani - Guitar
Carlos Cantatore - Drums
Kiara - Vocals

External links 
 Wings at Encyclopaedia Metallum

2004 albums
Skylark (Italian band) albums
Scarlet Records albums